"Take My Hand" is a song by Australian pop rock band 5 Seconds of Summer. It was released on 1 April 2022 as the second single from their fifth studio album 5SOS5.

Background and composition
The band teased the song on 31 March 2022 via social media. The song was written by lead singer Luke Hemmings and was produced by guitarist Michael Clifford. Hemmings spoke about the song and its meaning.

The track runs at 126 BPM and is in the key of C major.

Personnel
Credits for "Take My Hand" adapted from AllMusic.

Musicians
Luke Hemmings – composer, guitar, programmer, keyboards, vocals
Michael Clifford – guitar, keyboards, producer, programmer, backing vocals
Calum Hood – bass, keyboards, backing vocals
Ashton Irwin – backing vocals, drums, keyboards

Production
Neal Avron – engineering
Chris Gehringer – engineering
Chris Kasych – engineering
Matt Pauling – engineering
Scott Skrzynski – mixing assistant

Charts

Release history

References

2022 singles
2022 songs
5 Seconds of Summer songs